Phyllidia polkadotsa is a species of sea slug, a dorid nudibranch, a shell-less marine gastropod mollusk in the family Phyllidiidae.

Distribution 
This species was described from the Hawaiian Islands.

Description
This nudibranch has a yellow or orange coloured dorsum with large round black spots which are surrounded by a paler, translucent, ring. There are three longitudinal ridges along the back and small, scattered, tubercles.

Diet
This species feeds on a sponge.

References

External links
 

Phyllidiidae
Gastropods described in 1993